Hal Bernton is an American author and journalist. He works for The Seattle Times and also worked for the Anchorage Daily News. He was part of two reporting teams that received  Pulitzer Prizes. He has received journalism grants from the  Pulitzer Center. and had an O'Brien Fellowship in Public Service Journalism of Marquette University from 2013 to 2014

References 

Living people
The Seattle Times Company
Pulitzer Prize for Public Service winners
Pulitzer Prize winners
Year of birth missing (living people)